Del Valle is an unincorporated community in Los Angeles County, California, United States.

History

The community is named after Don Ygnacio del Valle, a wealthy Californio ranchero and politician, whose Rancho San Francisco encompassed the site of the community.

See also
Valencia, California
Val Verde, California

References

Unincorporated communities in Los Angeles County, California
Unincorporated communities in California